Turnus was the legendary King of the Rutuli in Roman history, and the chief antagonist of the hero Aeneas in Virgil's Aeneid.

According to the Aeneid, Turnus is the son of Daunus and the nymph Venilia and is brother of the nymph Juturna.

Historical tradition

While there is a limited amount of information in historical sources about Turnus, some key details about Turnus and the Rutuli differ significantly from the account in the Aeneid. The only source predating the Aeneid is Marcus Portius Cato's Origines. Turnus is also mentioned by Livy in his Ab Urbe Condita and by Dionysius of Halicarnassus in his  (Rômaïkê Archaiologia, "Roman Antiquities"), both of which come later than the Aeneid. Turnus is mentioned in the Pseudo-Jasher, along with Angeas of Africa. 

In all of these historical sources, Turnus' heritage is unclear. Dionysius calls him Tyrrhenus, which means "Etruscan", while other sources suggest a Greek ancestry. In all of these sources, Turnus and his Rutulians are settled in Italy prior to the arrival of the Trojans and are involved in the clash between the Latins and the Trojans, but there is a great deal of discrepancy in details. It appears that Virgil drew on a variety of historical sources for the background of Turnus in the Aeneid.

Virgil's Aeneid

Prior to Aeneas' arrival in Italy, Turnus was the primary potential suitor of Lavinia, the only daughter of Latinus, King of the Latin people. Upon Aeneas' arrival, however, Lavinia is promised to the Trojan prince. Juno, determined to prolong the suffering of the Trojans, prompts Turnus to demand a war with the new arrivals. King Latinus is greatly displeased with Turnus, but steps down and allows the war to commence.

During the War between the Latins and the Trojans (along with several other Trojan allies, including King Evander's Arcadians), Turnus proves himself to be brave but hot-headed. In Book IX, he nearly takes the fortress of the Trojans after defeating many opponents, but soon gets into trouble and is only saved from death by Juno.

In Book X, Turnus slays the son of Evander, the young prince Pallas. As he gloats over the killing, he takes as a spoil of war Pallas' sword belt and puts it on. Enraged, Aeneas seeks out the Rutulian King with full intent of killing him. Virgil marks the death of Pallas by mentioning the inevitable downfall of Turnus. To prevent his death at the hands of Aeneas, Juno conjures a ghost apparition of Aeneas, luring Turnus onto a ship and to his safety. Turnus takes great offense at this action, questioning his worth and even contemplating suicide.

In Book XII, Aeneas and Turnus duel to the death; Aeneas gains the upper hand amidst a noticeably Iliad-esque chase sequence (Aeneas pursues Turnus ten times round, between the walls of Latium and the lines of men, much as in the duel between Achilles and Hector), wounding Turnus in the thigh. Turnus begs Aeneas either to spare him or give his body back to his people. Aeneas considers but upon seeing the belt of Pallas on Turnus, he is consumed by rage and finishes him off. The last line of the poem describes Turnus' unhappy passage into the Underworld.

Turnus' supporters include: his sister and minor river/ fountain deity, Juturna; Latinus's wife, Amata; the deposed king of the Etruscans, Mezentius; and Queen Camilla of the Volsci, allies in Turnus’ fight against Aeneas, the Trojans, and their allies.

In later literature
In the Middle English poem Sir Gawain and the Green Knight, the unknown poet cites as a parallel to Brutus of Troy's founding of Britain, that of an unidentified "Ticius" to Tuscany. Although some scholars have tried to argue that "Titius" is derived from Titus Tatius, Otis Chapman has proposed that "Ticius" is a scribal error for what the poet intended to read as Turnus. On top of manuscript stylometric evidence, Chapman notes that in a passage in Ranulf Higdon's Polychronicon, Turnus is also named as King of Tuscany. This suggests that legends in the age after Virgil came to identify Turnus "as a legendary figure like Aeneas, Romulus, "Langeberde", and Brutus".
In Book IX of John Milton's Paradise Lost, the story of Turnus and Lavinia is mentioned in relation to God's anger at Adam and Eve.

Interpretation
Turnus can be seen as a "new Achilles," due to his Greek ancestry and his fierceness.  According to Barry Powell, he may also represent Mark Antony or local peoples who must submit to Rome's empire.  Powell adds that in the dispute between Turnus and Aeneas, Turnus may have the moral upper hand, having been arranged to marry Lavinia first.  However, Turnus must be stopped since he is running counter to the force of destiny.

References

External links

Kings in Roman mythology
Characters in the Aeneid